Sou (Portuguese for: 'I Am') is the first studio album from Rio singer Marcelo Camelo, lead singer of the band Los Hermanos, launched in 2008.

Track listing

References

2008 debut albums
Marcelo Camelo albums
Portuguese-language albums
Albums produced by Marcelo Camelo